Dasht-e Razm-e Olya (also Romanized as Dasht-e Razm-e ‘Olyā; also known as Dasht-e Razm-e Khalīfeh Hārūn) is a village in Javid-e Mahuri Rural District, in the Central District of Mamasani County, Fars Province, Iran. At the 2006 census, its population was 472, in 104 families.

References 

Populated places in Mamasani County